All Time Greatest Hits, Vol. 1-4 are four compilation albums, issued by RCA of early 1940s Tommy Dorsey tracks featuring Frank Sinatra.

The albums contain hits such as "I'll Never Smile Again" and "I'll Be Seeing You".

Track listing Vol. 1 
 "The Sky Fell Down" (Louis Alter, Edward Heyman) - 3:24
 "I'll Be Seeing You" (Sammy Fain, Irving Kahal) - 3:05
 "Fools Rush In (Where Angels Fear to Tread)" (Bobby Bloom, Johnny Mercer) - 3:14
 "Imagination" (Johnny Burke, Jimmy Van Heusen) - 3:12
 "I'll Never Smile Again" (Ruth Lowe) - 3:09
 "Our Love Affair (Roger Edens, Arthur Freed) - 3:01
 "Oh! Look at Me Now" (Joe Bushkin, John DeVries) - 3:14
 "Without a Song" (Edward Eliscu, Billy Rose, Vincent Youmans) - 4:28
 "Let's Get Away from It All" (Tom Adair, Matt Dennis) - 5:00
 "Blue Skies" (Irving Berlin) - 3:18
 "Street of Dreams" (Sam M. Lewis, Victor Young) - 2:41
 "Take Me" (Rube Bloom, Mack David) - 2:59
 "Be Careful, It's My Heart" (Berlin) - 2:48
 "There Are Such Things" (Stanley Adams, Abel Baer, George W. Meyer) - 2:41
 "Light a Candle in the Chapel" (Duke Leonard, Nelson, E.G., Harry Pease) - 3:03

Track listing Vol. 2 
"The One I Love (Belongs to Somebody Else)" (Isham Jones, Gus Kahn)
"April Played the Fiddle" (Johnny Burke, James Monaco)
"Stardust" (Hoagy Carmichael, Mitchell Parish)
"We Three (My Echo, My Shadow and Me)" (Dick Robertson, Nelson Cogane ( Nelson Cogane Fonarow; 1902–1985), Sammy Mysels)
"Yours Is My Heart Alone" (Franz Lehár, Ludwig Herzer, Fritz Löhner-Beda)
"Polka Dots and Moonbeams" (Johnny Burke, Jimmy Van Heusen)
"Whispering" (Vincent Rose, Richard Coburn, John Schonberger)
"I Could Make You Care" (Sammy Cahn, Saul Chaplin)
"East of the Sun (and West of the Moon)" (Brooks Bowman)
"Too Romantic" (Johnny Burke, James Monaco)
"How About You?" (Burton Lane, Ralph Freed)
"This Love of Mine" (Sol Parker, Hank Sanicola, Frank Sinatra)
"Violets for Your Furs" (Matt Dennis, Tom Adair)
"Dolores" (Frank Loesser, Louis Alter)
"Everything Happens to Me" (Matt Dennis, Tom Adair)
"It's Always You" (Johnny Burke, Jimmy Van Heusen)
"A Sinner Kissed An Angel" (Mack David, Larry Shayne)
"I Guess I'll Have to Dream the Rest" (Mickey Stoner, Bud Green, Martin Block)
"In the Blue of Evening" (Tom Adair, Alfred D'Artega)
"Just As Though You Were Here" (Ed DeLange, John Benson Brooks)

Credits
 Executive Producer: Don Wardell
 Liner Notes: Patrick Snyder
 Digital Engineer: Dick Baxter
 Digital Producer: Chick Crumpacker
 Performers: Tommy Dorsey & His Orchestra, Frank Sinatra, Connie Haines, The Pied Pipers

References

Frank Sinatra compilation albums
Tommy Dorsey albums